George Leighton Dahl (May 11, 1894 – July 18, 1987) was a prominent American architect based in Dallas, Texas during the 20th century. His most notable contributions include the Art Deco structures of Fair Park while he oversaw planning and construction of the 1936 Texas Centennial Exposition. In 1970, in anticipation of imminent commercial growth brought on by the impending development of the Dallas/Fort Worth International Airport, he designed the First National Bank of Grapevine building at 1400 South Main Street.  This iconic cubist structure served as a harbinger of the area's upcoming economic development.

Background
George Dahl was born in Minneapolis to Norwegian immigrant parents, Olaf G. and Laura (Olson) Dahl. He received a B.Arch. from the University of Minnesota and a M.Arch. from Harvard University in 1923. He subsequently spent two years in Italy as a fellow at the American Academy in Rome.

Career
In 1926, he began work for the Herbert M. Greene Co. in Dallas, Texas. He became a partner in Greene's firm in 1928, and the name of the firm was changed to Herbert M. Greene, LaRoche, and Dahl (later LaRoche and Dahl).

In 1943, Dahl founded his own firm, George Leighton Dahl, Architects and Engineers, Incorporated, with a nationwide practice.  Dahl was also a pioneer in fast-track construction. Upon his retirement in 1973, he had produced some 3,000 projects throughout the country that are estimated to be worth $2 billion.

Personal life
Dahl was married twice: in 1921 to Lillie E. Olson, with whom he had one daughter, and in 1978 to Joan Renfro. Dahl died of dehydration at the age of ninety-three at his home in Dallas.

Significant work

Dallas Projects:

  
Other projects:
 First National Bank Building, 303 W. Wall St., Midland, TX, 1952
 Tanglewood Resort, Lake Texoma, 1960
 DC Stadium, later renamed to RFK Stadium, Washington, D.C., 1962
 Medical facilities for: Dallas Methodist Hospital, Dallas Public Health Center
 Central Library for The University of Texas at Arlington
 Texas Hall for The University of Texas at Arlington 
 Education facilities for: University of Texas, University of North Texas, East Texas State College, University of Plano, Southern Methodist University, Jesuit High School
 Prisons for the Texas Department of Corrections
 Retail stores for Sears, Roebuck and Co.

References

External links
 Texas Handbook Online
 University of Texas Library
 Architectural Images

1894 births
1987 deaths
American people of Norwegian descent
20th-century American architects
People from Dallas
Architects from Minneapolis
University of Minnesota School of Architecture alumni
Harvard Graduate School of Design alumni
Architects from Texas